Canvas is an unincorporated community in Nicholas County, West Virginia, United States. Canvas has a post office with ZIP code 26662.

Canvas was originally named Earl but the residents of the area were not fond of the name. Around 1910, Charles William “Bill” Bryant owned a general store and was selling canvas gloves which were a huge hit with the community. At that point, residents held a meeting and it was decided that they would rename the community to Canvas.

References

Unincorporated communities in Nicholas County, West Virginia